Washington Court is a bungalow court located at 475 E. Washington Blvd. in Pasadena, California. The court consists of six single-family homes arranged in an "L" shape; a common walkway and garden runs along the east side of the court, while a driveway on the west side accesses a rear garage. The homes are designed in the English Cottage Revival style and feature cross gabled roofs with wooden louvers at the gable ends, wooden trim and window moldings, and arched entrances with flared eaves. F. R. Finch commissioned the court in 1924; the homes cost $2,250 each to build.

The court was added to the National Register of Historic Places on November 15, 1994.

References

Bungalow courts
Houses in Pasadena, California
Houses completed in 1924
Houses on the National Register of Historic Places in California
National Register of Historic Places in Pasadena, California
Historic districts on the National Register of Historic Places in California